This is a list of members of the South Australian Legislative Council from 1965 to 1968.

 LCL MLC Sir Frank Perry died on 20 October 1965. Murray Hill was elected to fill the vacancy on 4 December.
 LCL MLC Dudley Octoman died on 11 September 1966. Arthur Whyte was elected to fill the vacancy on 29 October.
 LCL MLC Leslie Harold Densley resigned on 24 April 1967. Victor George Springett was elected to fill the vacancy on 2 June.

References
Parliament of South Australia — Statistical Record of the Legislature

Members of South Australian parliaments by term
20th-century Australian politicians